Olof Viktor "Olle" Åberg (24 January 1925 – 20 December 2013) was a Swedish middle distance runner. He competed in the 1500 metres at the 1952 Olympics and finished seventh.

Åberg was born in Hofors, and in addition to the local club Hofors AIF he represented Gefle IF. With Gefle IF he participated in setting a world record in the 4×1500 metres relay at 15:34.6 minutes in 1947. The team improved the record in 1949. Åberg won the national 1500 m title in 1951. Next year, on 10 August 1952, he set a world record in the 1000 metres at 2:21.4.

References

1925 births
2013 deaths
Sportspeople from Gävleborg County
Swedish male middle-distance runners
Athletes (track and field) at the 1952 Summer Olympics
Olympic athletes of Sweden